Adi Kadi Vav or Adi Chadi Vav is a stepwell in Uparkot Fort, Junagadh, Gujarat, India. The date of its construction is uncertain.

History

According to Junagadh district administration website, the stepwell was constructed in 15th century. Other sources says that it was constructed in second half of the 10th century or in 11th century during the rule of Chudasama dynasty. Another source says that it was constructed in 319 BCE and rediscovered in 976 CE.

According to local historian Parimal Rupani, there were two separate stepwells. It is the Adi stepwell and the Kadi stepwell is still buried, according to him.

It is a state protected monument (S-GJ-114).

Architecture
Adi Kadi Vav is a Nanda type of stepwell. It is not built but carved out of solid natural rock. There is a flight of 166 steps in a narrow corridor to reach well shaft. A small window is carved in the thin rock layer above the well. The rock strata is visible in the eroded walls. The well is 123 feet deep. There is no ornamentations, shafts or pillars as in other stepwells.

Popular culture 
According to a legend about its name, when the stepwell was constructed, no water was found. But on instruction of the royal priest, two unmarried girls named Adi and Kadi were sacrificed and the water was found. Another legend tells that Adi and Kadi were the royal maids who fetched water from the stepwell every day. People hangs cloths and bangles on the tree nearby to commemorate them.

There is a proverb in Gujarati: .

Gallery

See also
 Navghan Kuvo
 Stepwell
 Rani ki vav
 History of stepwells in Gujarat

References

Stepwells in Gujarat
Junagadh
Tourist attractions in Junagadh district
Rock-cut architecture